Saucillo is one of the 67 municipalities of Chihuahua, in northern Mexico. The municipal seat lies at Saucillo. The municipality covers an area of 2,116.16 km².

As of 2010, the municipality had a total population of 32,325, up from 28,508 as of 2005. 

As of 2010, the city of Saucillo had a population of 11,004. Other than the city of Saucillo, the municipality had 451 localities, the largest of which (with 2010 populations in parentheses) were: Naica (4,938), Las Varas (2,410), classified as urban, and Estación Conchos (1,670), and Orranteño (1,641), classified as rural.

Geography

Towns and villages
The municipality has 168 localities. The largest are:

References

Municipalities of Chihuahua (state)